Greater Saint John is a metropolitan area surrounding Saint John, New Brunswick, Canada. It has a population of 126,202.

The Census Metropolitan Area of Saint John consists of 16 municipalities and parishes in addition to the City of Saint John.

List of towns, communities and cities

See also
Transportation in Greater Saint John

References

 
Geographic regions of New Brunswick
Metropolitan areas of New Brunswick